Underworld is a 2004 Sri Lankan Sinhala action thriller film directed by Sudesh Wasantha Pieris and produced by Mission Hearts Films. It stars Arjuna Kamalanath and Nilanthi Dias in lead roles along with Wasantha Kumaravila and Rex Kodippili. Music composed by Achala Soloman. It is the 1043rdh Sri Lankan film in the Sinhala cinema.

Plot

Cast
 Arjuna Kamalanath as Mahesh
 Nilanthi Dias as Imali
 Wasantha Kumaravila as Suraj
 Rex Kodippili
 Cletus Mendis
 Robin Fernando
 Dayaratne Siriwardena
 Melani Ashoka
 Sapna Kareem

References

2004 films
2000s Sinhala-language films